Petar Stoyanov (born 6 March 1960) is a Bulgarian swimmer. He competed in the men's 4 × 200 metre freestyle relay at the 1980 Summer Olympics.

References

1960 births
Living people
Bulgarian male freestyle swimmers
Olympic swimmers of Bulgaria
Swimmers at the 1980 Summer Olympics
Place of birth missing (living people)